"Yɛn Ara Asaase Ni" is the unofficial national anthem of Ghana. It was written and composed by Ephraim Amu in 1929 and is popularly sung in Twi. The original is however in the Ewe language.

Anthem
The first line in the original Ewe lyrics is "Mia denyigba lɔ̃lɔ la". This translates in English as "Our cherished homeland" or "Our beloved homeland". It was translated into Twi at the time when the Gold Coast was in search of an anthem to replace the colonial one from the United Kingdom, "God save the King". It was among four anthems shortlisted. God Bless Our Homeland Ghana by Philip Gbeho was the one that was eventually selected.

The song is often played or sung on national occasions in Ghana. Many people however continue to lobby for the current Ghana national anthem to be replaced by this song.

Lyrics 
The patriotic song "Yɛn Ara Asaase Ni" was written by Ephraim Amu and sung In the Ewe language. It was later translated into Twi and then English. The title version translates into English as "This Is Our Own Native Land"; it envokes a message of nationalism, and each generation doing their best to build on the works of the previous generation.

References

External links
 "Yen Ara Asase Ni with Translation" - audio of anthem, with information and lyrics
"Mia denyigba lɔ̃lɔ la" performed in Ewe by the Chœur de l’Unité Togolaise at the Ecowas choir festival April 2019 in Lomé Togo
Lyrics in Ewe, Twi, English and Ga

Ghanaian music
National symbols of Ghana
Articles containing video clips